Pseudolaguvia inornata is a species of sisorid catfish from the Feni River drainage in Bangladesh.

References

Catfish of Asia
Taxa named by Heok Hee Ng
Fish described in 2005
Erethistidae